El Soplao (Cantabrian: El Sopláu) is a cave located in the municipalities of Rionansa, Valdáliga and Herrerías in Cantabria, Spain. It is considered unique for the quality and quantity of geological formations (speleothems) in its 17 miles length, 6 of which are open to the public. In it are formations such as helictites (eccentric stalactites defying gravity) and curtains (draperies, or sheets of calcite, sometimes translucent, hanging from the ceiling). Its formation dates back to the Mesozoic, in particular the Cretaceous period 240 million years ago.
The entrance is at 540 metres in the Sierra Soplao Arnero.

The cave was accidentally discovered during drilling for mining, subsequently being exploited for the extraction of minerals. During its operation, many local families were supported by the income they got from the mining, combined with farming livestock. After decades of neglect, speleology, and in particular the Cantabria University Speleology Club since 1975, have discovered its true geological value.

On July 1, 2005 the Government of Cantabria opened it to the public and publicised it internationally, after development for tourism and protection rules prohibiting any further activity by the discovering club. Research goes on, resulting in the study of amber deposits, the recognition of underground stromatolites formed by manganese-oxidising bacteria, and a new mineral form, zaccagnaite-3R.

The cave recently started holding music concerts. Artists like Bertín Osborne or Nando Agüeros have played inside the cave for hundreds of people in 2016.

El Soplao is just one of at least 6,500 caves in Cantabria.

Situation

The cave is located in the Sierra de Arnero, part of the Sierra del Escudo de Cabuérniga, between the towns of Rionansa, Herrerías and Valdáliga and around San Vicente de la Barquera. The Sierra de Arnero runs parallel to the Cantabrian Sea, with a maximum altitude of 682 metres.

To access the cave you can use the Cantabrian motorway.

Galleries

El Soplao is a very extensive network of caves and developed at several levels. Cave metrics (December 2003) are:
http://www.microbemagazine.org/index.php/05-2011-current-topics/3353-manganese-oxidizing-microbes-form-giant-stromatolites-in-caves
 Length of natural passages surveyed (12,585 metres).
 Length of mined passage connected with the cave (3,240 metres).
 Lacuerre Caves (2,927 metres).
 Total System length (17,852 metres).

Gallery of the Ghosts
It is a natural room which had the amount of thick white and stalagmite formations rising from the ground pisolitic for her figure, gave rise to the name of the gallery. The gallery is 350 metres long and some areas reaching 35 metres wide. Its name comes from the great white stalagmites that resemble ghosts, in the end zones of the gallery. Had a great use to the early twentieth century as a place of extraction and storage by the mineral miners of La Florida.

Gallery Gorda
It is a room with a natural underground lake and one of the largest in terms of volume. This is the first gallery to be accessed Soplao. The name comes from the impression of smallness due to one of the cavers who investigated the caves. It has a lighting system that highlights the colours of the stalactite from the ceiling, covered with calcite helictitas.

Gallery of the False Floor
Small chamber where impressive rock formations in the form of thin threads that are screwed everywhere.

Gallery of the Camp
Is of moderate dimensions, with widths up to 10 metres. The name comes from the installation of a research camp during the first raids. Here it remained unbroken 208 hours Speleo Club members Cantabria highlight the cast, dyed red and white minerals in the area.

Gallery of the Cauliflower
Stand, rather than stalactites, stalagmites huge, often eccentric, that they tend to join at the end with the roof. Can be seen traces of an earthquake that hit the spot.

Gallery of the Forest
High gallery which takes its name from its resemblance to a natural forest. The cast and the union of stalactites and stalagmites happen everywhere, creating large and varied columns. As in the Galería of the Cauliflower can be seen traces of an earthquake.

Gallery Genesis
Located to the east. It is one of the highest, reaching 30 metres high. Its length exceeds 160 metres. Notable cast sheets, giant stalagmites pisolitic nests. Its name comes from the number of colours displayed on it, because of the variety of salts dissolved in water.

Other galleries
 Gallery of Bridge
 Gallery of the Mermaid
 Gallery Columns
 Gallery Grey
 Gallery of the Avalanche
 Gallery of the Goat
 Gallery the Wonders
 Gallery Wet

Mineral and fossils

This is the list of minerals and fossils found in the cave, in alphabetical order:

Fossils
Amarantoraphidia ventolina
 Amber
 Black amber
Cantabroraphidia marcanoi
Necroraphidia arcuata

Minerals

 Aragonite
 Calcite
 dolomite
 Sphalerite
 Galena
 Marcasite
 Pyrite

See also
 Caves in Cantabria

References 

Cantabrian Speleogical Club "The Cave of El Soplao, a unique cave" (1987)

Bibliography
 Francisco Fernández Ortega and Maria del Carmen Urioste Valls, El Soplao fantasy in the darkness, Creatic Publishing (2007).
 John Hill (between others), El Soplao, a unique cavity, Creatic Editions (2003).

External links
 El Soplao official website
 Cantabrian Speleolo Club: discoverers of much of El Soplao
 More information on El Soplao
 News report on 110 Million year old amber containing trapped insects studied in El Soplaoe
 Photos of caving in El Soplao
 Manganese-Oxidizing Microbes Form Giant Stromatolites in Caves

Prehistoric sites in Spain
Archaeological sites in Spain
Show caves in Spain
Soplau